Powerpet [ పవర్ పేట ] is a suburb of Eluru city. It is located in the II-town area Police Jurisdiction of the city. An underpass is constructed below the railway line to connect Powerpet with RR Peta Area.

History 
Between 1893 and 1896, 1,288 km (800 mi) of the East Coast State Railway, between Vijayawada and Cuttack, was opened for Freight & Civilian traffic and Halt Station was Constructed. It is named after British railway engineer Sir Power in memory of his contribution to the locality's development of suburb.

Demographics
There are a total population of 10,000 persons living in 2,000 houses in Powerpet.

Transport
Many Arterial roads passes through Powerpet. Eluru Old bus station is situated in this locality. Chennai-Kolkata National railway line divides Powerpet from 1-Town. Powerpet railway station provides railway connectivity to this region.

Commercial area 
Power Pet is one of the most popular Commercial Area  in Eluru which is famous for its Electronic Stores, furniture, Beauty Parlours, Textile & Clothing and Gyms

Healthcare and Education

Places of Worship 
Sri Kashi Annapurna Sametha Visweshwara Swamy Vari Temple, Sri Vasudevalayam  are the most popular pligrime site in the area

References 

Neighbourhoods in Eluru